A serving channel (sometimes called a depot channel) is a slang term for a file sharing channel found on an IRC network.  Here, users can share and download files including photos, videos, audio files, books, programs, etc.  Users that are actively sharing their files are generally referred to as 'servers', whereas users that download without sharing their own files are generally referred to as 'leeches'.  While serving normally implies pirated or questionable material, some channels are used for fully legitimate reasons.  There are two styles of servers, Fserves, and serving scripts like OmenServe.

Fserve type channels 
Using an Fserve script, a server is set up like an FTP.  Using CTCP commands and server triggers, a user can initiate a connection with the server.  Once connected, the user will be given realtime access to a server's file archive.
ex.: "/CTCP <username> <trigger>"

Searching and requesting with Fserves 
Once a leech has gained access to a server's Fserve, they can navigate through folders using commands similar to DOS.  Once inside a folder, the user is able to retrieve a listing of what files are found there.
ex.: "cd <foldername>" & "dir" (to display files)

To request a file, the user enters a filename from the folder display listing, along with the "get" command.
ex.: "get <filename.ext>"

Serving script type channels 
Using a serving script, servers have the ability to send files directly to another user using remote commands.  The serving script compiles a listing of available files, and also listens for a leech to request a file.  Serving scripts also allow for a user to search all of the servers in a channel at the same time with a single command.

Searching and requesting with serving scripts 
A user initiates a search by typing a 'search command' followed by a 'search string' within the channel window.  Various search commands exist, including '@find', '@search', and '@seek', depending on what serving script is being used.  Wildcard characters such as * can also be used in the search string to simplify a search.  The search command will then return a list of files to the user's query window if any servers have a file that matches the search string.
ex.: "@find <keyword>"

If there are any matches for the user's search string, the next step is to request those files from the server.  The user can copy and paste the returned match, along with a short trigger command, from the query window directly into the channel window.  The request is then placed in a file queue within the serving script, and downloaded on a first-come, first-served basis.
ex.: "!<username> <filename.ext>"

Users also have the ability to download the complete archive of a server's available files, commonly called a "list" due to the .txt format that the script's output code creates.  To request a server's list, there is a separate 'list trigger' used.
ex.: "@<username>"

See also 
 DCC
 XDCC
 File sharing
 Peer-to-peer

External links 
 Omenscripts family of file sharing scripts
 Sooplex IRC, mIRC file serving make easy

Internet Relay Chat
File sharing
Warez
Internet terminology